K.G.F is an Indian Kannada-language period action film series set mostly in the Kolar Gold Fields, which gives the series its name, created by Prashanth Neel and produced by Hombale Films starring Yash. Set in the late 1970s and early 1980s, the series follows Raja Krishnappa Bairya alias Rocky (Yash), a Mumbai-based high ranking assassin born in poverty and his rise to power in the gold mines.

The first installment Chapter 1 was released on 21 December 2018 and became the highest grossing Kannada film at the time. The sequel Chapter 2 was released on 14 April 2022. The sequel broke several opening day records and also overtook its predecessor as the highest grossing Kannada film, the first Kannada film to gross 500 crores and 1000 crores. It also went on to become the fourth highest-grossing Indian film worldwide, and also the second-highest-grossing Indian film of 2022. A sequel titled, K.G.F: Chapter 3, teased in the second film, is in early development.

Films

K.G.F Chapter 1 

Rocky, a high-ranking gangster in Mumbai seeks power and wealth in order to fulfill his mother's promise. He is hired to assassinate Garuda, who runs the operations at the gold mines in Kolar.

K.G.F Chapter 2 

After having assassinated Garuda, Rocky establishes himself as the kingpin of K.G.F. He now has to deal with ruthless foes: Garuda's uncle Adheera, who wants to take control of K.G.F, and Ramika Sen, the Prime Minister of India, who wants to wipe out K.G.F and Rocky.

Development 
In March 2015, Yash signed for four projects which included one with Prashanth Neel. The project was considered to be one of the most expensive films in Kannada cinema. Hombale Films, the production house led by Vijay Kiragandur, bankrolled the project, and one of its production executive Karthik Gowda, stated that "KGF, which is set in the 70s, took over one and a half years of pre-production, because they wanted to ensure they got every single detail right, be it the matchboxes, telephone, or the clothes people wore." Neel, stated that the film would be launched in April 2016, and the shooting would begin in May 2016. Ravi Basrur was also hired for the project, while Bhuvan Gowda handled the cinematography.

In an interview with The Times of India, Prashanth Neel stated that he planned to split the film in two parts, as the narration of the story is in a non-linear format. He further stated "The scale of the project is huge and we had a scope for a beginning, an interval, and an end for both parts, so it made sense for us to release it as two parts".

In December 2020, during the making of its second installment, Neel denied rumours of a third installment in the KGF franchise, claiming that the story would conclude in its second part. However, at the end of the second film, it was hinted that the story would continue with a third part titled K.G.F: Chapter 3.

Casting 
Yash grew his beard and long hair for his role as Rocky. Yash's friend, driver  and bodyguard Ramachandra Raju was cast as Garuda after he was spotted by Neel. In January 2017, Srinidhi Shetty was cast alongside Yash. Neel offered the role of Rocky's mother to newcomer Archana Jois, who was apprehensive at first to act as a mother despite being in her twenties but later accepted the role. In August 2017, Vasishta Simha bagged a pivotal role in the film. For the second part, Sanjay Dutt was roped in for a pivotal role in February 2019, marking his Kannada debut.

On 29 July 2019, Sanjay Dutt was revealed to be playing the role of the main antagonist Adheera. Raveena Tandon was reported to play the role of Prime Minister Ramika Sen, and stated that "it was a difficult character to portray".

Telugu actor Rao Ramesh was cast in a pivotal role in May 2019, and Tamil actor Saran Shakthi was cast in August 2019. On 26 August 2020, when the filming resumed, Prakash Raj was also revealed to be playing Anant Nag's son.

Filming 
In July 2016, the filmmakers kick-started a 15-day schedule in North Karnataka, without Yash, as the actor was shooting for Santhu Straight Forward (2016). The first schedule of the film took place on a huge set, which took more than 35–40 days to construct. The film was slated to take off earlier that year, but was pushed back because of problems surrounding the Kalasa Banduri issue, which meant the team had to cancel its initial shoot schedule plans. The film's shooting then began on mid-January  after completing the final stages of pre-production. The filmmakers erected huge sets at Badami, to recreate Kolar from the 1970–80s period, thereby filming extensively in the location. In June, the project was 50 percent complete, and production had restarted after sets were rebuilt, following their destruction by heavy rains.

Some sequences of the movie, which has Yash and Srinidhi Shetty in the lead roles, were also shot at the centenary clock tower located next to the University of Mysore campus. Yash entered the final schedule of the film in April 2018. As of May 2018, the filmmakers completed major portions of the film, except one song. On 9 August 2018, Tamannaah was hired for a song number, thus marking her second film appearance in Kannada, after Jaguar (2016). On 17 August 2018, the filmmakers announced that shooting of the film had wrapped, although another song shoot for the film's Hindi version, featuring Yash and Mouni Roy, took place at the Goregaon Studio on December. 

Filming for K.G.F: Chapter 2 started on 13 March 2019 in Hyderabad, with a formal puja ceremony. After an initial round of filming near Bangalore in May 2019, Yash announced that he will join the sets only in June 2019. The shoot at Cyanide Hills in Kolar Gold Fields was interrupted by a complaint from N Srinivas, president of the KGF's National Citizens Party who filed a petition against the makers and alleged that the film is being shot in a cyanide grounds area  In September 2019, the makers started shooting for the second schedule in Hyderabad where Sanjay Dutt joined the sets of the film in Hyderabad. After a court stay order on 27 September, the makers returned to shoot the film at Kolar. In October 2019, the makers returned to Karnataka, after filming the extensive schedule in Hyderabad.

In January 2020, the makers completed 80% of the shoot. With the schedule being filmed in Mysore, the last leg of shoot was expected to be held in Hyderabad, and then in Bangalore and Kolar. In February 2020, Telugu actor Rao Ramesh joined the sets of the film. Raveena Tandon joined the sets of the film in Mysore on 12 February.  The makers completed major portions in March 2020, with post-production works being kickstarted, but filming came to a halt due to the COVID-19 pandemic lockdown in India.  Prashanth Neel claimed that Sanjay Dutt had completed shooting for the film, with only dubbing for his portions, is pending, after Sanjay Dutt was diagnosed with lung cancer, and left US for immediate treatment on 12 August 2020.

The film was resumed in August 2020 at Bangalore post a gap of 5 months. Malavika Avinash and Prakash Raj joined the sets on this schedule. On 7 October 2020, Yash and Srinidhi Shetty resumed the shoot at Mangalore, with the team entering the final leg of shoot. Sanjay Dutt confirmed that he will join the shooting of the film on November, although he resumed the shooting only in December. The climax action scenes were filmed in December 2020 at Hyderabad.

Cast and crew

Cast

Crew

Box office

Future 
In January 2023, Vijay Kiragandur stated in an interview that K.G.F Chapter 3 might start filming only in 2025 for a release in 2026 due to Prashanth Neel's commitments with Salaar  and a film with  Jr. N.T.R. He also added that another actor might play the role of Rocky in the future replacing Yash, akin to the James Bond franchise. Kirangandur also added "Going forward, we are going to create a Marvel kind of universe. We want to bring different characters from different movies and create something like Doctor Strange."

See also
Cop Universe
YRF Spy Universe
 Lokesh Cinematic Universe

References

External links
 
 

Film series introduced in 2018
Action film franchises
Thriller film series
Films released in separate parts
Indian film series